Josip Šikić, sometimes spelled Josef or Joseph and nicknamed Joschi (born 4 August 1929) is a Croatian retired footballer.

Playing career
A product of Dinamo Zagreb academy, Šikić played for the Blues from 1953 to 1962, appearing in 153 Yugoslav First League matches and scoring 3 goals. He helped the club win the 1953–54 championship and the 1960 Yugoslav Cup and was a member of a generation which included well known Dinamo players such as Željko Čajkovski, Tomislav Crnković, Dražan Jerković and Luka Lipošinović.

In 1963 he moved to Austrian side Wacker Innsbruck and in his first season helped the club win the West division of the Austrian Regional League, which saw them promoted to the Austrian top division. He stayed with the club until 1967 and appeared in 72 Austrian top flight matches for Wacker. In 1967, he moved to SV Austria Salzburg before retiring two years later in 1969.

Managerial career
After retiring from active football he worked as manager, first at the now-defunct club SV Rapid Lienz 1971–1972, and then at Austria Salzburg in the 1972–1973 season, finishing 7th in the Austrian championship. From 1976 to 1979 he was a member of the coaching staff at SSW Innsbruck, during the period when his son, Boris Šikić, played for the club.

References

External links
Josip Šikić career overview at Tivoli12.at 

1929 births
Living people
Association football defenders
Yugoslav footballers
GNK Dinamo Zagreb players
FC Wacker Innsbruck players
FC Red Bull Salzburg players
Yugoslav First League players
Austrian Football Bundesliga players
Austrian Regionalliga players
Yugoslav expatriate footballers
Expatriate footballers in Austria
Yugoslav expatriate sportspeople in Austria
Yugoslav football managers
FC Red Bull Salzburg managers
Yugoslav expatriate football managers
Expatriate football managers in Austria